Mash Confusion is the debut album by American rap group A-1, released August 24, 1999 on Sick Wid It and Jive Records. A-1 is composed of Big Bone and D-Day. The album features production by Bosko, K-Lou, Sam Bostic, Studio Ton and Tone Capone. Several guest performers appear on the album, including: E-40, B-Legit, Little Bruce, Killa Tay, Phats Bossi and Nikki Scarfoze.

Along with a single, a music video was produced for the song, "Big Man", featuring E-40.

The song, "Represent", originally appeared on the 1997 compilation album, Southwest Riders and was also released as a music video to promote the compilation. The video features cameo appearances by E-40, B-Legit, Celly Cel and Suga-T.

A-1 first appeared together on the 1995 Sick Wid It compilation album, The Hogg in Me, on the song, "All Work No Play".

Critical reception 

Allmusic - "Featured on Sick Wid It's Southwest Riders compilation barely a year before, A-1's album debut for the label is a bruising piece of midtempo G-funk, stacked with machine-gun percussion and A-1's slick raps. Though E-40 features on the best track, "The Big Man," there are plenty of great jams and spotlights for A-1, on "Gangstaz Anthem," "Mathematics," and "Represent."

Track listing 
 "Intro" – 1:00
 "Mathematics" (featuring E-40, Phats Bossi, Nikki Scarfoze & Little Bruce) – 6:04
 "Keep It to Ya Self" (featuring Filthy Phil) – 5:10
 "Gangsta's Anthem" (featuring Killa Tay) – 4:08
 "Big Man" (featuring E-40) – 4:39
 "What the Fuck Can I Do" – 4:47
 "Critic Killaz" (featuring The Mossie) – 4:51
 "Mash Confusion" – 3:26
 "Struggle N' the Projects" (featuring Harm) – 3:53
 "Represent" – 4:25
 "Tryin' to Get It" (featuring B-Legit, Nikki Scarfoze & Mr. Malik) – 3:28
 "Faces" – 4:19
 "Niggaz Just Learn" – 4:03
 "Keep Ya Thang" – 4:02
 "Minor League Throwdown" (featuring Livin' Proof, K-Cree, I.Q. & A.D.) – 3:49
 "Little 'Bout Me" – 4:10
 "Twisted" – 3:57
 "Outro" – 1:12

References

External links 

Mash Confusion at Discogs

1999 debut albums
Albums produced by Studio Ton
Albums produced by Bosko
Jive Records albums
Sick Wid It Records albums
Gangsta rap albums by American artists
West Coast hip hop albums